Anthony A. Goodman (born January 11, 1940) is an American breast cancer surgeon and author. He is Adjunct Professor of Medicine at Montana State University WWAMI Medical Sciences Program and is Affiliate Professor in the Department of Biological Structure at the University of Washington School of Medicine.

Biography
Goodman earned a B.A. from Harvard College, and an M.D. from Cornell Medical College. He trained as a surgical intern and resident at the University of Michigan Medical Center in Ann Arbor. He completed his surgical training and served as chief resident at the Harvard Surgical Service of Boston City Hospital, the New England Deaconess Hospital, the Lahey Clinic, and Cambridge Hospital.

For 20 years, he worked as a general surgeon in south Florida and served as Clinical Associate Professor of Surgery at the University of Miami School of Medicine.

He also served as a surgeon with the U.S. Army Medical Corps during the Vietnam War and on the hospital ship, Project HOPE.

He was also Visiting Professor of Surgery at the Christchurch, New Zealand, Clinical School of Medicine. Founder of the Broward Surgical Society, Dr. Goodman is a Fellow of the American College of Surgeons and a Diplomate of the National Board of Medical Examiners and the American Board of Surgery.

Dr. Goodman has recorded several medical courses for The Great Courses, a video publisher in Chantilly, Virginia. These recorded video courses have included: (i) Understanding The Human Body. Anatomy and Physiology, (ii) The Human Body: How We Fail; How We Heal, (iii) Lifelong Health: Achieving Optimum Well-Being at Any Age, and (iv) Myths of Nutrition and Fitness.

As author
 None But the Brave: A Novel of the Surgeons of World War II. Deer Creek Publishing Group. 2012
 The Shadow of God: A Novel of War and Faith, published in four languages worldwide.  Sourcebooks, 2002
 Never Say Die: A Doctor and Patient Talk About Breast Cancer.  Appleton-Century-Crofts, 1980.

See also
WWAMI Regional Medical Education Program

References

External links
 Anthony A. Goodman Curriculum Vitae

21st-century American novelists
American surgeons
American male novelists
American historical novelists
1940 births
Living people
Harvard College alumni
United States Army Medical Corps officers
United States Army personnel of the Vietnam War
University of Michigan staff
Weill Cornell Medical College alumni
21st-century American male writers